Southern Bavarian or South Bavarian, is a cluster of Upper German dialects of the Bavarian group. They are primarily spoken in Tyrol (i.e. the Austrian federal state of Tyrol and the Italian province of South Tyrol), in Carinthia and in the western parts of Upper Styria. Due to the geographic isolation of these Alpine regions, many features of the Old Bavarian language from the Middle High German period have been preserved. On the other hand, the Southern Bavarian dialect area is influenced by the Rhaeto-Romance languages, locally also Slovene and to a lesser extent Italian.

The speech area historically included the former linguistic enclaves in Carniola (present-day Slovenia) around Kočevje in the Gottschee region (Gottscheerish), Sorica (Zarz) and Nemški Rovt (Deutsch Ruth). The Cimbrian language still spoken in several language-islands in north-eastern Italy (Friuli, Veneto and Trentino) mostly counts as a separate Bavarian language variant. Southern Bavarian is also spoken in the Werdenfelser Land region around Mittenwald and Garmisch-Partenkirchen in German Upper Bavaria.

The Tyrolean Unterland, the Alpine regions of Salzburg (Pinzgau, Pongau and Lungau), as well as the adjacent parts of Styria and southern Burgenland form the dialect continuum with the Central Bavarian language area in the north.

See also
Hutterite German
Mòcheno language

References 

Bavarian language
Languages of Germany
Languages of Switzerland
Languages of Austria
German dialects